Byron Schenkman (born 1966) is an American harpsichordist, pianist, music director, and educator. Schenkman has recorded over 40 CDs and has won several awards and accolades. He co-founded the Seattle Baroque Orchestra, and was its artistic director. Schenkman currently directs a baroque and classical chamber music concert series, Byron Schenkman & Friends, and performs as a recitalist and concert soloist. He also performs with chamber music ensembles, and is a teacher and lecturer.

Early years
Schenkman grew up in a musical family on a farm in Lafayette, Indiana. He graduated from the New England Conservatory, where he was a student of John Gibbons. He studied with Elisabeth Wright and Edward Auer at the Indiana University Jacobs School of Music, and earned a Master of Music degree with Honors in Performance. In 1990 he earned a Performer's Certificate in Harpsichord from Indiana University School of Music. In 1991 Schenkman was a finalist in the Cambridge Society for Early Music's International Mozart Competition.

Career
At first Schenkman played harpsichord and fortepiano. He has recorded dozens of albums, and has made solo and concerto appearances in the Americas, Europe, and Asia. In 1999 he won the Cambridge Society for Early Music's Erwin Bodky Award, given "for outstanding achievement in the field of early music". In 2003 Schenkman's recording with Musica Pacifica, Telemann: Chamber Cantatas & Trio Sonatas, won the Chamber Music America/WQXR Record Award. In 2004 Schenkman was awarded a Partners of the Americas travel grant which enabled him to perform and teach in Chile. In 2006 Schenkman was voted "Best Classical Instrumentalist" by the readers of the Seattle Weekly newspaper. In 2007 he was featured in the Seattle Magazine Music Portfolio of Seattle's Defining Musicians as a Key Player saying that "He makes 300-year-old music sound fresh."

Schenkman has worked with baroque violinist Ingrid Matthews. In 1994 they co-founded Seattle Baroque Orchestra, where Schenkman was artistic director from 1994 through 2004, and co-director from 2010 to 2013. In 2014 Schenkman and Matthews received the Indiana University Jacobs School of Music Entrepreneur of the Month award. He also performs with various chamber ensembles and tours internationally with his contemporaries. He performs as a guest artist with chamber music ensembles in North America. His live performances at the Boston Early Music Festival have been compared with those of Vladimir Horowitz and Jimi Hendrix. He was reviewed in The Boston Globe as "a superb and imaginative instrumentalist".

Schenkman gave his first recital on modern piano at Town Hall, Seattle, in 2001, and has since been active performing and recording on modern piano and harpsichord. His New York recital debut playing modern piano was in 2009. Schenkman's playing has been described as "dazzling" in American Record Guide, and listed in the Chicago Tribune as a favorite recording of 2000, for "stylish, invigorating performances". He released The Art of the Harpsichord in 2017 to critical acclaim, featuring eight different historical harpsichords from the National Music Museum.

In 2013, Schenkman formed Byron Schenkman and Friends.

In 2017 Schenkman created a new recording label named Byron Schenkman & Friends. In 2018 the recording label name was changed to BS&F Recordings.

Schenkman teaches music history at Seattle University, where he is a member of the Fine Arts Faculty in the College of Arts and Sciences. He was a member of the Early Music Faculty at Cornish College of the Arts in Seattle, where he taught harpsichord, piano, and music history from 2005 to 2017. In 2012 Schenkman was visiting instructor of fortepiano and harpsichord at the Indiana University Jacobs School of Music. Schenkman gives master classes on 18th-century performance, informal lecture-recitals, and pre-concert talks. He also teaches harpsichord master classes, serves artistic residencies, and teaches music history at music festivals and universities. Schenkman is a frequent guest on radio station 98.1, Classical KING-FM.

His principal harpsichord was built by Craig Tomlinson in 2013.

Discography

Solo recordings
 Johann Kaspar Kerll: Keyboard Suites & Toccata – FOCUS, 1996 ASIN: B000004A7B
 The Bauyn Manuscript: 17th-century French Harpsichord Music – WILDBOAR [WLBR 9603], 1996
 Jean-Henry D' Anglebert – Centaur Records, 1997 [CRC 2435]
 George Frideric Handel: Harpsichord Variations – Centaur Records, 1997 [CRC 2436]
 Louis Couperin: Harpsichord Music – Centaur Records, 2001 [CRC 2608]
 The Fitzwilliam Virginal Book –  with Maxine Eilander, harp, Centaur Records, 2001 [CRC 2638]
 Jacques Duphly: Second Livre de Pieces de Clavecin – Centaur Records, 2002 [CRC 2714]
 Joseph Haydn: Sonatas for the Harpsichord – Centaur Records, 2002 [CRC 2733]
 Joseph Haydn: Six Sonatas and an Adagio with Katie Wolfe, violin, – Centaur Records, 2005 [CRC 2733] [CRC 2806]
 Muzio Clementi – Centaur Records, 2009 [CRC 3078]
 The Art of the Harpsichord – Byron Schenkman & Friends, 2017 ASIN: B074CPHTTY
 Sonatas by Domenico Scarlatti - BS&F Recordings, 2018 ASIN: B07DP5Y3GS

Collaborative recordings
 Joseph Bodin de Boismortier: Sonatas for Flute and Harpsichord, Op. 91 – American Baroque, Stephen Schultz, baroque flute; Byron Schenkman, harpsichord, Naxos Records [Catalogue No. 8.553414], 1995
 Mozart in Mannheim – Zephyrus ensemble; Courtney Westcott, flute; Ingrid Matthews, violin; Shelley Taylor, cello; Byron Schenkman, harpsichord and fortepiano; Dana Maiben, viola;  FOCUS [# 945], 1995
 in Stil Moderno – Ingrid Matthews, violin; Byron Schenkman, harpsichord,  WILDBOAR [WLBR 9512], 1995
 Elizabeth Jacquet de la Guerre: Sonates pour le Viollon 1707 – Ingrid Matthews, violin; Byron Schenkman, harpsichord; Margriet Tindemans, viola da gamba,  WILDBOAR [WLBR 9601], 1995
 Jean-Fery Rebel: Sonatas pour le Violin – Ingrid Matthews, violin; Byron Schenkman, harpsichord; Margriet Tindemans, viola da gamba,  WILDBOAR [WLBR 9602], 1995
 Georg Frideric Handel: Tra Le Fiamme – Byron Schenkman, harpsichord; Ellen Hargis, soprano,  WILDBOAR [WLBR 9604], 1996
 Andrea Falconieri – Ingrid Matthews & Scott Metcalf, violins; Emily Walhout, viola da gamba; Byron Schenkman, harpsichord,  WILDBOAR [WLBR 9605], 1996
 Marin Marais: Suites en Trio, Pieces de Violes, 4th Livre – Music's Re-Creation, Byron Schenkman, harpsichord, Centaur Records  [CRC2334], 1997
 Marin Marais: Pieces en Trio – Musica Pacifica,     Virgin Veritas [ZDMB 7243], :  1997
 J.S. Bach: Harpsichord Concertos – Byron Schenkman, harpsichord; Ingrid Matthews, violin, Centaur Records [CRC 2497], 1998
 Il Giardino Corrupto – Scott Metcalfe & Ingrid Matthews, baroque violins; Emily Walhout, viola da gamba; Byron Schenkman, harpsichord,   WILDBOAR [WLBR 9903], 1999
 Antonio Vivaldi: Bassoon Concertos – Ingrid Matthews, violin; Byron Schenkman, harpsichord; Michael McCraw, bassoon, Centaur Records [2538], 1999
 Canzoni da Sonar – Ingrid Matthews, baroque violin; Byron Schenkman, harpsichord, Centaur Records [CRC 2529], : March 2000
 Francesco Guerini: Cello Sonatas – Sarah Freiberg, baroque cello; Byron Schenkman, harpsichord and fortepiano, Centaur Records [2534], 2000
 Alessandro Scarlatti: Concerti Da Camera – Musica Pacifica, Judith Linsenberg, recorders, Elizabeth Blumenstock, violin, Ingrid Matthews, violin; George Thomson, viola; Claire Garabedian, cello; Michael Eagan, flute; Byron Schenkman, harpsichord,  DORIAN [DOR 93192], Release date: 01/11/2000
 Sprezzatura: Virtuoso Music of 17th Century Italy – Ensemble: La Luna, Ingrid Matthews & Scott Metcalf, violins; Emily Walhout, viola da gamba; Byron Schenkman, harpsichord,  DORIAN (DOR #93200)  2001
 Georg Philipp Telemann: Chamber Cantatas & Trio Sonatas – Musica Pacifica ensemble, Judith Linsenberg, recorder; Christine Brandes, Elizabeth Blumenstock, violin; Byron Schenkman, harpsichord,  DORIAN [DOR-93239]; 2001
 Heinrich Biber: Sonatas for Strings – Byron Schenkman, harpsichord; Ingrid Matthews, violin; David Greenberg, violin, Centaur Records [ CRC 2615], 2001
 Alessandro Scarlatti: Agar et Ismaele Esiliati [The Exile of Hagar and Ishmael] – Ingrid Matthews, violin; Byron Schenkman, harpsichord; with Karina Gauvin, Nathaniel Watson, Melissa Fogarty, Jennifer Lane, Centaur Records [ CRC 2664], Recorded: November 2001
 Music of J.S. Bach: Sonata in D Major, BWV 1028 – Emily Walhout, viola da gamba; Byron Schenkman, harpsichord, Centaur Records [CRC 2715], 2002
 J.C. Bach: Sonatas for Fortepiano and Flute – Byron Schenkman, fortepiano; Courtney Westcott, flute;   LOFT Recordings  [LRCD 1045], 2003
 Wind and Wire: Music of 18th Century Scotland – Chris Norman, Baroque Flutes; Byron Schenkman, Harpsichord,  Boxwood Media (824594005223) [BOX 903], 2003
 The Pachelbel Canon and other Baroque Favorites – Byron Schenkman, harpsichord; Ingrid Matthews, violin,  LOFT Recordings [LRCD 1019], 2003
 J. S. Bach: Six Sonatas for Violin & Harpsichord – Ingrid Matthews, baroque violin; Byron Schenkman, harpsichord;  Independent Release, 2007, ASIN: B00125WBUY, 2-CD set
 Mozart: Piano Trios – Byron Schenkman, piano; Gabriela Diaz, violin; Alexei Yupanqui Gonzales, cello, Centaur Records [CRC 3031], 2008
 Russian Dreams – Byron Schenkman, piano; Masha Lankovsky, violin, Centaur Records [CRC 3352] 2014
 Vivaldi: Chamber Works – Byron Schenkman, harpsichord; Ingrid Matthews, violin; Nathan Whittaker, cello; John Lenti, theorbo; Tekla Cunningham, violin, Centaur Records [CRC 3307] 2014
 Beethoven alla Britannia – Byron Schenkman, piano; Ingrid Matthews, violin; Nathan Whittaker, cello; Linda Tsatsanis, soprano, Centaur Records [CRC 3497] 2016
 Britten and Pears: The Canticles - Byron Schenkman, piano; Zach Finkelstein, tenor; Vicki St. Pierre, contralto; Alexander Hajek, baritone; Jeffrey Fair, horn; Valerie Muzzolini Gordon, harp, Scribe Records, [SRCD9] 2017
 Chamber Music of Clara Schumann - Byron Schenkman, piano; Jesse Irons, violin; Kate Bennett Wadsworth, cello, BS&F Recordings (888295931601), 2019

Albums available as MP3 download only
 Meditation: Baroque Music for Relaxation – Various Artists, Centaur Records, 2010
 The J.S. Bach Exercise Album – Various Artists, Centaur Records, 2013

References

External links 
 Official website:
 'Ep. 66: Byron Schenkman, harpsichordist, pianist and music director' Interview by Tigran Arakelyan

American harpsichordists
Fortepianists
American classical pianists
Male classical pianists
American male pianists
Musicians from Seattle
1966 births
Living people
Cornish College of the Arts faculty
American performers of early music
Founders of early music ensembles
Baroque musicians
American music educators
Music directors
20th-century American pianists
21st-century classical pianists
20th-century American male musicians
21st-century American male musicians
21st-century American pianists
Centaur Records artists
Naxos Records artists